Melanohalea columbiana is a species of foliose lichen in the family Parmeliaceae. It was described as a new species in 2016. The type was collected at the Rock Creek (Palouse River tributary) of the Channeled Scablands, where it was found growing on a species of hawthorne. The specific epithet columbiana refers to its occurrence in the Columbia River drainage basin and Columbian Plateau. The lichen has been recorded from Idaho, Washington, Central Oregon, and a single locale in the Peninsular Ranges in Southern California. It is morphologically similar to Melanohalea multispora, but is genetically distinct from that species.

References

columbiana
Lichen species
Lichens described in 2016
Lichens of North America
Taxa named by Helge Thorsten Lumbsch
Taxa named by Ana Crespo
Taxa named by Pradeep Kumar Divakar